is a railway station in Kashiwara, Osaka Prefecture, Japan.

Lines
 West Japan Railway Company
 Yamatoji Line

History 
Takaida Station opened on 29 August 1985.

Station numbering was introduced in March 2018 with Takaida being assigned station number JR-Q28.

References 

Railway stations in Osaka Prefecture
Railway stations in Japan opened in 1985